The Modern College of Design is a private, for-profit college in Kettering, Ohio focused on graphic design. Founded in 1983 by advertising artist Tim Potter, the college trains creative artists to become professional graphic designers, and web designers with an Associate degree and a bachelor's degree completion program.

External links
Official website

Graphic design schools in the United States
Private universities and colleges in Ohio
Art schools in Ohio
Educational institutions established in 1983
Education in Montgomery County, Ohio
1983 establishments in Ohio